Grigorije is a Serbian masculine given name, a variant of Greek Grēgorios (English: Gregory) meaning "watchful, alert". It has been used in Serbian society since the Middle Ages. It may refer to:

Grigorije the Pupil (fl. 1186), author of Miroslav Gospel
Elder Grigorije (fl. 1310–1355), Serbian nobleman, Orthodox cleric and writer.
Grigorije Camblak (ca. 1365–1420), Eastern Orthodox cleric and Bulgarian and Serbian writer
Grigorije of Gornjak (fl. 1375–79), Serbian Orthodox monk
Grigorije Račanin ( 1639), Serbian writer
Grigorije Durić (1966), Serbian Orthodox bishop

See also
Gligorije
Grgur

References

Sources
 

Serbian masculine given names